The Commander of the Lebanese Armed Forces is responsible for the operational command of the Lebanese Armed Forces (LAF). According to the Constitution, the President of Lebanon is the commander-in-chief. The commander always holds the General rank.

Commanders
This is a list of the LAF commanders from its establishment in 1945 to the present:

See also
 Lebanese Armed Forces

References

Commanders of the Armed Forces
Lebanon
Commanders in chief